New Haven is the central settlement and a census-designated place (CDP) in the town of New Haven, Addison County, Vermont, United States. It was first listed as a CDP prior to the 2020 census.

It is in north-central Addison County, in the north-central part of the town of New Haven. Vermont Route 17 passes through the community, leading east  to Bristol and west  to U.S. Route 7 at New Haven Junction.

References 

Populated places in Addison County, Vermont
Census-designated places in Addison County, Vermont
Census-designated places in Vermont